Two Fathers is a 1944 British wartime propaganda short film made by the Crown Film Unit, a division of the Ministry of Information, and directed by Anthony Asquith.

Plot
An Englishman (Bernard Miles) and a Frenchman (Paul Bonifas) find themselves sharing a room in a hotel in an unidentified English location, and fall into conversation.  The Englishman's son is in the Royal Air Force, and when the Frenchman shows him a photograph of his daughter, the Englishman remarks that it is less worrisome to have a daughter than a son at this time of war.  The Frenchman replies that his daughter, a nurse by profession, is currently an active member of the Maquis.  The Englishman says that he has received news that his son was forced to bail out of his plane over France the previous day, and the Frenchman observes that there are many thousands of French men and women who will risk their own safety to help a downed British airman.

References

External links 
 
 

1944 films
Films directed by Anthony Asquith
British World War II propaganda shorts
British black-and-white films
Crown Film Unit films
British war films
1940s war films
1940s English-language films